Hold 'Em Yale, alternately known as At Yale, is a 1928 American silent comedy film directed by Edward H. Griffith and starring Rod La Rocque, Jeanette Loff, and Hugh Allan. It was adapted from the Owen Davis play of the same name, and executive-produced by Cecil B. DeMille. The film was preserved by the Academy Film Archive in 2013.

Cast
Rod La Rocque as Jaime Emmanuel Alvarado Montez
Jeanette Loff as Helen Bradbury
Hugh Allan as Jack Bradbury
Joseph Cawthorn as Professor George Bradbury
Tom Kennedy as Detective
Jerry Mandy as Jaime's Valet
Lawrence Grant as Don Alvaro Montez
Oscar Smith as Black Butler

Production
Production of Hold 'Em Yale began on December 27, 1927.

References

External links

1928 films
American films based on plays
American black-and-white films
American football films
Films set in Connecticut
Pathé Exchange films
Films directed by Edward H. Griffith
American silent feature films
1920s English-language films
1920s American films